Martin Birck's Youth is a 1901 novella by Swedish author Hjalmar Söderberg. It takes place in Stockholm.

References

1901 Swedish novels
Swedish novellas
Swedish-language novels
Novels set in Stockholm